Kevin Leese Mannix (born November 26, 1949) is an American politician, business attorney, and former chairman of the Republican Party in the U.S. state of Oregon.

Mannix has served in both houses of the Oregon Legislative Assembly, as a Democrat and, later, a Republican. He is known for his advocacy of statewide ballot measures and as a candidate for the statewide offices of attorney general and governor.

Early political career 
Mannix earned a bachelor's degree in liberal arts in 1971 from the University of Virginia. In 1974, he earned his J.D. degree from the University of Virginia School of Law.

Prior to serving in the legislature, Mannix worked in several different capacities, including Assistant Attorney General of Oregon, Assistant Attorney General of Guam, and a law clerk to the Oregon Court of Appeals.

Mannix was elected to the Oregon House of Representatives five times beginning in 1988. From 1989 through 1996, Mannix served in the Oregon House of Representatives as a Democrat. In 1997, he became a Republican and was appointed to the Oregon State Senate. He was elected back into the Oregon House in November 1998 and served through 2000.

Ballot measure advocacy 
Mannix is a driving force behind the effort to get tougher sentences for criminals. In 1994, he authored Ballot Measure 11, which established mandatory minimum sentences for violent crimes, including murder, manslaughter, serious assault, kidnapping, rape, sodomy, unlawful sexual penetration, sexual abuse, and robbery. This measure has also now been used to set automatic sentencing on accidental deaths due to addiction issues. A companion measure, Measure 10, also passed, amending the Oregon Constitution to provide that any criminal sentence established by a vote of the people cannot be reduced by the legislature except with a two-thirds vote of both houses. A third successful Mannix measure, Measure 17, amended the Oregon Constitution to establish a new section which requires that state prison inmates work full-time in useful work. This also allowed work time to include education courses, counseling, and job training.

In 1996, Mannix brought Ballot Measure 40 to the ballot. This contained several victims' rights and anti-crime provisions. The effects of these Measures is to set the primary locus of control in sentencing decisions with victims and prosecutors. Measure 40 passed by a margin of 59% to 41%, but was overturned by the Oregon Supreme Court in Armatta v. Kitzhaber, 327 Or. 250, 959 P.2d 49 (1998) on the grounds that it contained more than one amendment to the Oregon Constitution and should have been subject to separate votes on each provision.

Measure 40 returned to voters by legislative referral (engineered by Representative Mannix) as Measures 69–75 in November 1999. Of the seven referral measures four were passed by voters, which granted crime victims the right to be present during trial, to be consulted regarding plea bargains and to be heard at sentencing; limited the pre-trial release of violent criminals by authorizing courts to consider the safety of victims and the public; required that any term of imprisonment imposed by a court to be fully served, with the exception of the governor's clemency power; and prohibited felons from serving on grand juries and criminal trial juries.

In 2008, Mannix helped lead a citizen initiative effort for Measure 61 which would have created mandatory minimum prison sentences for certain theft, identity theft, forgery, drug and burglary crimes. This measure was trumped by Measure 57, a legislative referral which avoided mandatory minimum sentences in favor of increased sentences for drug trafficking, theft against the elderly, and certain repeat property and identity theft crimes.

Another citizen initiative effort led by Mannix in 2010, Measure 73, was approved. This measure provided a mandatory minimum prison sentence of 25 years for repeat convictions of the worst sex crimes and required a minimum sentence of 90 days in jail, with costs reimbursed to the county by the state, for persons with a third DUII conviction within 10 years.

In 2012, Measure 84, an effort to repeal Oregon's estate tax, was also supported by Mannix but was defeated.

For the Oregon 2014 general election, Mannix, and Common Sense For Oregon, are supporting several initiatives including No Taxes on Family Giving  and the Oregon Castle Doctrine.

Runs for statewide office 
In 1996, Mannix ran for Oregon Attorney General as a Democrat. At the last minute, Hardy Myers was recruited by Democrats to run against Mannix in the Democratic primary, as some felt Mannix was too conservative for their party. Myers defeated Mannix in the primary 62.8% to 36.8%. Myers went on to easily defeat his Republican opponent in the November general election. Mannix changed his party affiliation to Republican the following year, 1997. He was appointed to the state Senate in 1998.

In 2000, Mannix again ran for State Attorney General against Myers in a bitter campaign. Myers again defeated Mannix 49.8% to 46.2%. Libertarian candidate Tom Cox received 4.0%.  There is the possibility that Cox siphoned off votes from Mannix, although it's far from certain that enough of them would have supported him to deny Myers victory.

In 2002, Mannix ran for governor. In the Republican primary, he defeated former Labor Commissioner Jack Roberts and Portland attorney and school board chair Ron Saxton. He went on to run against Democrat Ted Kulongoski. Kulongoski won 49% of the vote versus 46% for Mannix. Libertarian candidate Tom Cox received 5% – a margin which many observe could have swung the election, had those votes gone to Mannix. The defeat also marked the fifth time in a row the Republicans failed to gain control of the governor's mansion.

Mannix became Oregon Republican Party Chair in January 2003, and stepped down in 2005.

In 2006, Mannix ran again for the Republican nomination for governor. He finished second in the primary with 30% of the vote, behind Saxton, who won the nomination with 43%, and ahead of state senator Jason Atkinson, who received 22%. Mannix was opposed in the primary by the Confederated Tribes of Grand Ronde, who spent $800,000 opposing the Columbia Gorge casino in the 2006 Democratic and Republican primaries. Saxton, widely considered more moderate than Mannix, went on to lose the general election in May to incumbent Kulongoski by an 8.1% margin.

In 2008, Mannix ran for the United States House of Representatives in the U.S. House primary election for Oregon's 5th congressional district to succeed retiring Democrat Darlene Hooley. Mannix ran a vigorous campaign, but was narrowly defeated by Mike Erickson, who went on to lose to Kurt Schrader in the general election due in part to personal issues that Mannix brought up in the primary.

Other accomplishments
Mannix serves as president for several organizations, including the Oregon Anti-Crime Alliance, which he founded in 2008, and Common Sense For Oregon, which he founded in 2009. He is a member of the board of directors for the Salem Catholic Schools Foundation, a role he has served since 1985, and has been president of the foundation since 2000.

Mannix was a founder and has served as chairman of the board of directors for Blanchet Catholic School in Salem since it opened in 1995, is a member of the Knights of Columbus  and has been a member of Rotary International since 1982.

Mannix has served on the national board of directors for Life Directions and the Salem Chamber of Commerce board of directors from 2007 to 2013.

Mannix is also a board member, and vice president, of the Johann Strauss Society of America Foundation. This organization was founded in 2013 and is dedicated to supporting the music heritage of Johann Strauss.

Funding
Mannix's main financial donor in his political career is Loren Parks, a businessman who is currently a resident of Nevada. Loren Parks has contributed over $4 million to Mannix's political efforts since 1994.

Electoral history
2008 race for U.S. House of Representatives – Republican primary
Mike Erickson (R), 49%
Kevin Mannix (R), 46%
2006 race for governor – Republican primary
Ron Saxton (R), 43%
Kevin Mannix (R), 30%
Jason Atkinson (R), 22%
2002 race for governor
Ted Kulongoski (D), 49%
Kevin Mannix (R), 46%
Tom Cox (L), 5%
2002 race for governor – Republican primary
Kevin Mannix (R), 35%
Jack Roberts (R), 29%
Ron Saxton (R), 28%
2000 race for state attorney general
Hardy Myers (D) (inc.), 50%
Kevin Mannix (R), 46%
2000 race for state attorney general – Republican primary
Mannix won the Republication nomination for Oregon Attorney General. 
1998 Oregon general election
Mannix defeated Democrat George Bell for Oregon House of Representatives District 32. 
1998 Oregon primary election
Mannix won the Republican nomination for House District 32.
1996 Oregon general election
Mannix defeated Republican Brian Seed for House District 32. 
1996 Oregon primary election
Former House Speaker Hardy Myers defeated Mannix for the Democratic nomination for attorney general. 
1994 Oregon primary election
Mannix won the Democratic nomination for House District 32. 
1992 Oregon general election
Mannix defeated Republican challenger Mark Berlin for House District 32 by 68% to 32%
1992 Oregon primary election
Mannix won the Democratic nomination for House District 32. 
1990 Oregon general election
Mannix defeated two challengers for House District 32. Mannix won with 64% of the vote.
1990 Oregon primary election
Mannix won the Democratic nomination for House District 32.
1988 Oregon general election
Mannix defeated Republican incumbent Chuck Sides for House District 32.
1988 Oregon primary election 
Mannix won the Democratic nomination for Oregon House of Representative District 32.

See also
 List of American politicians who switched parties in office
Oregon gubernatorial election, 2006
United States House of Representatives elections in Oregon, 2008

References

External links
Kevin Mannix on BallotPedia.org
Gubernatorial campaign site
Kevin Mannix Law Firm
Bio on Oregon Republican Party Website
Project VoteSmart profile
Discussion of 2006 Candidates for Governor-NW Republican
Discussion of 2006 Candidates for Governor-Blue Oregon

1949 births
Living people
Members of the Oregon House of Representatives
Oregon Democrats
Oregon lawyers
Oregon Republican Party chairs
Oregon Republicans
Oregon state senators
People from Queens, New York
Politicians from Salem, Oregon
University of Virginia School of Law alumni
Lawyers from Salem, Oregon
21st-century American politicians